J.R. Dick Dowdy Park, or Dowdy Park as the locals know it, is a very active area in the community of Summerville, Georgia, located on highway 27 in Summerville. The park plays host to many events throughout the year in this small town in Northwest Georgia. Dowdy Park holds many historical stories and facts, time periods ranging from the 19th century up until the first decade of the 21st century. This map gives a general idea of the location of the park.

History 
The park holds many historic landmarks within it. The Couey House is probably the oldest of the landmarks. The Couey House was built in the early 1840s by Andrew McSelland Couey and his sons. These people were one of the first families to settle in Chattooga county. The house was originally made out of logs that were cleared from the land on which the house was built. However, Dowdy Park is not the original place where the house was built; it was moved there in the 1990s due to highway construction.

Another one of the historic landmarks is the Summerville railroad turntable and the train depot. The depot was constructed in 1889 and added to the Georgia central railroad system in 1901. The depot was used in the filming of two films: one made in 1998 and the other in 2004.

Annual events 
Dowdy park host many events annually.

 Relay For Life- This event is held annually on the fourth Friday and Saturday in May. The relay for life is the American Cancer Society's rally for cancer research and is always a huge event for the people of Chattooga county.
 Sum-Nelly- A celebration to welcome the fall season with locals bringing arts, crafts, and entertainment.
 Arts & Crafts Festival- Also occurring in October the arts and crafts festival gives a huge turnout.
 Willow Spring Antique Show- The people of chattooga country gather to buy, sell, and trade antiques.
 Chili & Stew Cook Off- This offers a bit of competition between the men and women and different generations of chattooga county.

References 

Protected areas of Chattooga County, Georgia
Parks in Georgia (U.S. state)